Paramount Ranch Racetrack  (sometimes called Paramount Ranch Raceway) was a motorsports racetrack located at Paramount Ranch in the Santa Monica Mountains in Agoura Hills, California.  A total of seven events were held at Paramount Ranch from 1956-1957.  After a series of fatalities in short proximity to each other, the track gained a reputation for being a dangerous circuit.  After two seasons, Paramount Ranch Racetrack was closed.

Background
In 1956, the owner of Paramount Ranch decided to build a road-racing facility.  He approached Ken Miles and Dick Van Laanen to design the road course.  They designed a paved road course nearly  miles in length.  The road course included 11 turns with uphill and downhill sections, a straightaway just shy of  mile, a bridge and underpass as well as a lake opposite the start/finish line.  Bob Bondurant described the course as “unforgiving but a real challenge”.

Events
A total of seven events were held at Paramount Ranch.  Five events were sponsored by the California Sports Car Club (CSCC) and two by the United States Auto Club (USAC).

August 18–19, 1956 (CSCC)

November 4, 1956 (USAC)
 USAC National Championship Stock Car Road Race.  32 cars entered the race with Sam Hanks winning the race in 3 hours and 36 minutes while driving his red and white 1956 Mercury finishing ahead of Johnny Mantz.

November 17–18, 1956 (CSCC)

March 9–10, 1957 (CSCC)

April 28, 1957 (USAC)
 USAC National Championship Stock Car race was won by Troy Ruttman driving a 1957 Ford.  Ruttman finished 41 seconds ahead of Sam Hanks, followed closely behind by Jimmy Reece.

June 15–16, 1957 (CSCC)

Multiple MGTDs crashed during the first race resulting in five people being injured including one driver that was hospitalized.

This was Chuck Daigh's first overall win in a main event and also the first time a Ford V8 powered car won a major sports car race in the US.  In the under 1500cc main event, Ken Miles was subsequently disqualified several days later due to a rule infraction when judges ruled that Miles made a brief pit-stop in a restricted area to accept a drink of water during the one-hour race.  Runner up Jack McAfee who was also driving a Porsche 550 Spyder was declared the winner.

December 7–8, 1957 (CSCC)

Two fatalities and two others were injured on what would be the final event at Paramount Ranch.

During the third race, Hugh Woods driving his Corvette crashed into a guard rail entering turn 1.  The steel railing sliced through the car and Hugh’s right leg was severed.  He incurred injuries to his left leg as well and fractures in both arms.  

In the next race, a very similar accident occurred involving George Sherrerd driving his Jaguar XK120. Sherrerd hit the steel barrier which was still projecting after being hit by Woods in the previous race.  The steel sheared through the car and through Sherrerd.  He was killed instantly.    

Turn 1 was generally not considered a dangerous turn on the track.  The consensus was that both drivers just went into the turn “too hot.”  It was subsequently revealed the guardrail was installed incorrectly and was facing backwards.

In the fifth race, Rolf Roth hit a hay bale leaving turn 11 and flipped his Formula III.  Roth suffered a broken left wrist.  Roth’s roll bar was credited with saving him.

In the final race of the event, nearing the final lap of the race, Jim Firestone driving a Frazer Nash Bristol lost control near turn 2 and hit a stack of tires and his car flipped.  Firestone was ejected and was hit by the car which crushed his skull and neck.  He was  DOA upon arriving at Northridge Community Hospital.

Today
The National Park Service maintains the entire ranch including the racetrack as an historic site.  Today, very little remains of the racetrack.  As of 2015, the bridge still remains however it has been blocked off so vehicles cannot drive over it.  The road underneath the bridge has been overgrown with trees and shrubs.  Home construction in the neighboring hillsides has caused water runoff which has destroyed the original layout and terrain of the land from when it was constructed.  Much of the roads are no longer discernable.  While there is some sentiment among park rangers to repair the circuit and return the track to its former glory, there are no definitive plans in place.

In November 2018, Paramount Ranch suffered near-total destruction during the Woolsey Fire.

Film and television

Paramount Ranch Racetrack has been featured in several movies filmed in the 1950s and 1960s; most notably Devil’s Hairpin and Spinout.

It was also featured in television shows over the next decade, including Perry Mason  "The Case of the Runaway Racer" (1965).

Notes

References

Bibliography

External links
  National Park Service - Paramount Ranch

Motorsport venues in California
Defunct motorsport venues in the United States
Defunct sports venues in California
1956 establishments in California
1957 disestablishments in California
Sports venues completed in 1956